Deoria Lok Sabha constituency is one of the 80 Lok Sabha (parliamentary) constituencies in Uttar Pradesh state in northern India.

Assembly segments
Presently, Deoria Lok Sabha constituency comprises five Vidhan Sabha (legislative assembly) segments. These are:

Members of Parliament

Election results

2019 results

2014 results

2009 results

See also
Deoria district
List of Constituencies of the Lok Sabha

Notes

External links
Deoria lok sabha  constituency election 2019 result details

Lok Sabha constituencies in Uttar Pradesh
Deoria district